Breen may refer to:

 Breen (surname)
 The Breen (Star Trek), an alien species in the Star Trek universe.
 Breen, the Babylon 5 universe, a Narn cuisine similar to Swedish meatballs, first mentioned in the episode "Walkabout"
 Breens, the people of the fictional nation of Bregna in the animated television series Aeon Flux
 Jason Breen, fictional detective from the American TV series Kyle XY
 Wallace Breen, a major antagonist in the video game Half-Life 2
 Breen House, a house at St Michael's Grammar School in Melbourne, Australia
 Breen, Colorado, an unincorporated community
 Breen Township, Michigan
 Breen, County Antrim, a townland in County Antrim, Northern Ireland
 Breen, County Tyrone, a townland in County Tyrone, Northern Ireland

See also 
 Brean, a village in Somerset, England